Silves Municipality may refer to:

 Silves Municipality, Portugal
 Silves, Amazonas, Brazil (municipality)
Municipality name disambiguation pages